Barrientosiimonas endolithica is a Gram-positive, non-spore-forming, obligately aerobic and non-motile bacterium from the genus Barrientosiimonas which has been isolated from pebbles from Lalitpur in India.

References

 

Micrococcales
Bacteria described in 2015